Studies in Higher Education is a peer-reviewed academic journal of higher education, published by Routledge on behalf of the Society for Research into Higher Education. As of February, 2018, its editor is V. Lynn Meek, University of Melbourne.

Two issues per year were published until 1986, and three per year until 2001. Four were published in each of 2002 and 2003, and six issues per year from 2004 until 2008. It currently publishes ten issues per year.

The May 2020 special issue contains articles on the use of Wikipedia as a pedagogical and assessment tool.

References

External links
 

Education journals
10 times per year journals